Kris Sumono (born 23 December 1958) is an Indonesian former swimmer. He competed in four events at the 1976 Summer Olympics.

References

External links
 

1958 births
Living people
Indonesian male swimmers
Olympic swimmers of Indonesia
Swimmers at the 1976 Summer Olympics
People from Banda Aceh
Sportspeople from Aceh
Asian Games medalists in swimming
Asian Games silver medalists for Indonesia
Asian Games bronze medalists for Indonesia
Swimmers at the 1978 Asian Games
Medalists at the 1978 Asian Games
Southeast Asian Games medalists in swimming
Southeast Asian Games gold medalists for Indonesia
Competitors at the 1977 Southeast Asian Games
20th-century Indonesian people
21st-century Indonesian people